Sangerhausen is a town in Saxony-Anhalt, central Germany, capital of the district of Mansfeld-Südharz. About 26,000 people live in Sangerhausen (2020).

History

Sangerhausen is one of the oldest towns in the historical region of Saxony-Anhalt, being first mentioned in a document created between 780 and 802 in Fulda Abbey.

Sangerhausen is mentioned as the tithable place Sangerhus in Friesenfeld in the Hersfeld Tithe Register, created between 881 and 899.

It is mentioned in a document of 991 as appertaining to the estates of the emperor, as part of Memleben Abbey.

By marriage it passed to the landgrave of Thuringia, and after 1056 it formed for a while an independent country. Having been again part of Thuringia, it fell in 1249 to Meissen, and in 1291 to Brandenburg. In 1372 it passed to the Electorate of Saxony and formed a portion of that territory until 1815, when it became a part of the Prussian Province of Saxony.

Historical population

* After annexation of neighboring districts

** Population of Sangerhausen town in brackets

Municipality

The municipality of Sangerhausen currently consists of 15 divisions, also called (in German) Ortschafte. These are:

Breitenbach
Gonna
Grillenberg
Großleinungen
Horla
Lengefeld
Morungen
Oberröblingen
Obersdorf
Riestedt
Rotha
Sangerhausen
Wettelrode
Wippra
Wolfsberg

In 1994, the town of Sangerhausen, at that time still an independent municipality, became part of the so-called Verwaltungsgemeinschaft Sangerhausen, a municipal association consisting of Sangerhausen itself and the two villages/municipalities Edersleben and Oberröblingen. On 29 April 2000 Edersleben left for the Verwaltungsgemeinschaft Helme. On 1 January 2005 the municipalities Gonna, Grillenberg, Horla, Lengefeld, Morungen, Obersdorf, Pölsfeld, Rotha and Wettelrode joined the association from the Verwaltungsgemeinschaft Südharz which was dissolved. Six months later, on 3 July 2005 Pölsfeld left for the Verwaltungsgemeinschaft Allstedt-Kaltenborn.

On 1 October 2005 the Verwaltungsgemeinschaft Sangerhausen, consisting then of 10 municipalities was dissolved and turned into the single town/municipality Sangerhausen; which meant that the 9 villages were truly annexed. On the same date Breitenbach, Großleinungen and Wolfsberg also joined, coming from the municipal association Roßla-Südharz. On 1 December 2005 Riestedt followed, coming from the Verwaltungsgemeinschaft Allstedt-Kaltenborn. Finally, Wippra was incorporated on 1 January 2008, coming from the Verwaltungsgemeinschaft Wipper-Eine.

Main sights
Old Town Hall, erected in 1431–1437 after a previous edifice burned down in 1358
Church of St. Mary (Marienkirche), built in 1350 in Gothic style
Church of St. James (Jakobikirche, 1457–1542), a late Gothic hall edifice with a nave and three aisles. It has a 61 m-high, slightly tilting bell tower with a Baroque cover. The interior has a rich decoration painted by Georg Bottschild in 1665, while the choir stalls and the high altar are from an Augustinian monastery closed in 1539. It also houses numerous tombs and effigies. Johann Sebastian Bach applied here in 1702 for the post of organist, but the job went to Johann Augustin Kobelius.
Church of St. Ulrich (Ulrichkirche), one of the most interesting Romanesque edifices in Germany. It is a basilica built in 1116-1123, with a bell tower added in the 15th century. It has a nave and two aisles with groin vault. The eastern part has five apses.
The Altes Schloss ("Old Castle"), built by the lords of Meissen. Only a tower remains. The New Palace or Neues Schloss'' was built by Kaspar Tryller, minister of Finances of the Electorate of Saxony, from 1612 to 1622. It is a Renaissance style, and now houses the county court.

Transport
Sangerhausen station lies on the Halle–Hann. Münden railway and the Sangerhausen–Erfurt railway.

Twin towns – sister cities

Sangerhausen is twinned with:
 Baunatal, Germany

 Trnava, Slovakia
 Zabrze, Poland

Notable people

Andreas Knebel (born 1960), athlete
Thomas Liese (born 1968), cyclist
Manfred Möck (born 1959), actor
Norbert Nachtweih (born 1957), footballer
Werner Rothmaler (1908–1962), botanist and professor at the University of Greifswald
Einar Schleef (1944–2001), director and writer
Werner Stock (1903–1972), actor
Annekatrin Thiele (born 1984), rower
Julius von Bose (1809–1894), Prussian general of the infantry

References

Further reading

External links

Official website

Towns in the Harz
Mansfeld-Südharz